Graham Phillips may refer to:
 Graham Phillips (journalist) British journalist 
 Graham Phillips (writer), British author
 Graham Phillips (presenter), Australian television presenter
 Graham Phillips (actor), American actor